Charisse Millett (born February 11, 1964) is a Republican former member of the Alaska House of Representatives, representing the 25th District from 2009 to 2019.  In the 29th Legislature, from 2015 to 2016, she was the House Majority Leader.
In the 30th Legislature, she served the House Minority Leader. She has also served as co-chair of the Energy Special Committee, and is a member of the Community & Regional Affairs Committee, Rules Committee, Fisheries Special Committee, and Armed Services Committee. She also serves on the Administration, Health & Social Services, and Transportation & Public Facilities Finance Subcommittees, for the 26th Legislature. Charisse Millett was a former Alaska State Legislative aide from 2005 to 2007 before being elected into office. In 2018, she was defeated in the Republican primary by Josh Revak.

Personal life
Millett has three children and two grandchildren. She graduated from the Dimond High School in 1981, and attended the University of Alaska, Anchorage from 1981 to 1983.

References

External links
 Alaska State House Majority Site
 Alaska State Legislature Biography
 Project Vote Smart profile
 Representative Charisse Millett's Blog
 Charisse Millett at 100 Years of Alaska's Legislature

1964 births
21st-century American politicians
21st-century American women politicians
American fishers
Inupiat people
Living people
Republican Party members of the Alaska House of Representatives
Native American state legislators in Alaska
Native American women in politics
Politicians from Anchorage, Alaska
Politicians from Juneau, Alaska
University of Alaska Anchorage alumni
Women state legislators in Alaska